Diego Conson (born 11 January 1990) is an Italian footballer who plays as a defender for Sambenedettese.

Career

Carrarese
In July 2019, Conson was sold to Carrarese.

Siena
On 14 July 2021, he signed a two-year contract with Siena.

Sambenedettese
On 19 January 2022, he returned to Sambenedettese (now in Serie D) for his third stint with the club.

References

External links

1990 births
Living people
Lupa Roma F.C. players
Forlì F.C. players
A.S. Sambenedettese players
Reggina 1914 players
Carrarese Calcio players
Potenza Calcio players
A.C.N. Siena 1904 players
Serie C players
Italian footballers
Association football defenders
Footballers from Naples